John Fox (5 April 1948 – 17 March 1995) was an Irish independent politician and Teachta Dála (TD) for Wicklow.  He was a member of the Church of Ireland.

A farmer before entering politics, he was elected a Fianna Fáil member for Greystones on Wicklow County Council. He resigned from Fianna Fáil in 1992 and he was elected to the 27th Dáil at the 1992 general election. After his death at the age of 46 in 1995, his Dáil seat was won by his daughter Mildred Fox, who was re-elected at the 1997 and 2002 general elections.

See also
Families in the Oireachtas

References

1948 births
1995 deaths
Local councillors in County Wicklow
Independent TDs
Irish farmers
Members of the 27th Dáil
Politicians from County Wicklow
Fianna Fáil politicians
Irish Anglicans
People from Greystones